Iain Jardine (born 17 February 1958) is a Scottish former professional footballer who played as a midfielder.

Career
Born in Irvine, Jardine played in Scotland and Cyprus for Irvine Victoria, Kilmarnock, Partick Thistle, Anorthosis Famagusta, Heart of Midlothian and Kilwinning Rangers.

References

1958 births
Living people
Scottish footballers
Irvine Victoria F.C. players
Kilmarnock F.C. players
Partick Thistle F.C. players
Anorthosis Famagusta F.C. players
Heart of Midlothian F.C. players
Kilwinning Rangers F.C. players
Scottish Football League players
Cypriot First Division players
Association football midfielders
Scottish expatriate footballers
Scottish expatriate sportspeople in Cyprus
Expatriate footballers in Cyprus
Scotland under-21 international footballers